Rodrigo is a Spanish-language given name.

Rodrigo may also refer to:
Rodrigo (musician) (1973–2000), Argentine singer
Rodrigo (footballer, born 1897), Brazilian footballer
Rodrigo (footballer, born 1971), Brazilian footballer
Rodrigo Chagas (born 1973), Brazilian footballer
Rodrigo (footballer, born 1978), Brazilian footballer
Rodrigo (footballer, born 1979), Brazilian footballer
Rodrigo (footballer, born August 1980), Brazilian footballer
Rodrigo (footballer, born October 1980), Brazilian footballer
Rodrigo (footballer, born 1985), Brazilian footballer
Rodrigo (footballer, born 1987), Brazilian footballer
Rodrigo (footballer, born 1991), Brazilian-born Spanish footballer
Rodrigo (footballer, born 1994), Brazilian footballer
Rodrigo Freitas (born 1998), Brazilian footballer
Rodrigo (footballer, born 1999), Brazilian footballer
Rodrigo (beach soccer), born 1993, Brazilian beach soccer player
Rodri (footballer, born 1996), Spanish footballer
Rodrigo (opera), a 1707 opera by George Frideric Handel